News Live is a 24-hour Indian Assamese-language satellite news channel broadcasting news, current affairs and infotainment programmes. It is owned by Pride East Entertainments Pvt Ltd, a Guwahati based media group whose majority stake is owned by Riniki Bhuyan Sarma, wife of Assam Chief Minister Himanta Biswa Sarma. News Live has the highest viewership among all Assamese news channels.

Assamese of the Year
"Assamese of the Year" is an annual award presented by News Live. It carries a citation and 2 lakh Indian Rupees. The winner for this awards are:
 2009: Arnab Goswami
 2011: Jahnu Barua
 2012: Shiva Thapa
 2013: Gunaram Khanikar
 2014: Adil Hussain
 2015: Angaraag Mahanta (Papon)

Programming
Current Programmes
 Breakfast Live
 Deoboriya Adda
 Kotha Barta
 Good Morning Assam
 Guwahati Live
 Prekhyapot'
 Noixo Guwahati Talk Time''

See also 
 List of Assamese-language television channels
 Rang 
 Ramdhenu 
 Indradhanu

References

External links

Television stations in Guwahati
24-hour television news channels in India
Assamese-language mass media
Assamese-language television channels
Television channels and stations established in 2008
Mass media in Assam
Pride East Entertainments